Adama Fofana may refer to:

 Adama Fofana (footballer, born 1989), Ivorian footballer, forward
 Adama Fofana (footballer, born 1999), Burkinabé footballer, defender
 Adama Fofana (footballer, born 2001), Ivorian footballer, winger